Scott L. Johnson (born 1954) is an American farmer, consultant, and Republican politician.  He is a member of the Wisconsin State Assembly, representing Wisconsin's 33rd Assembly district since January 2023.

Biography
Scott Johnson was raised on his family's farm near Janesville, Wisconsin, and graduated from Milton High School.  He went on to earn his bachelor's degree in agricultural economics from the University of Wisconsin–Madison, in 1977, and attended a master's program at University of Wisconsin–Whitewater.

Johnson owns and operates his own farm, and has worked for many years as a farm consultant, including employment by the large agro-chemical company Monsanto.  He also worked as a school bus driver in the Jefferson school district for more than 20 years.

Political career

He was elected to the Fort Atkinson school board in 1998 and was re-elected several times, serving continuously through 2014. Johnson made his first run for Wisconsin State Assembly in 2014, running in the Republican primary for the 33rd Assembly district, which was being vacated by incumbent Stephen Nass, who was instead running for State Senate.  Johnson came in second in that primary, behind Cody Horlacher, who went on to represent the district for the next 8 years.

After the Spring 2022 election, Horlacher announced he would not run for re-election in the 2022 election, and would instead run for a Wisconsin circuit court judgeship in 2023.  Johnson announced his candidacy for the Republican nomination to replace Horlacher in the 33rd Assembly district.  He narrowly defeated Jefferson mayor Dale Oppermann in the Republican primary.   In the general election, he faced incumbent Democratic state representative Don Vruwink, who had been drawn into the 33rd Assembly district by the 2022 redistricting plan.  This proved to be the closest Assembly race in the state in 2022, and Johnson prevailed by just 247 votes (0.91%).

He will take office in January 2023.

Personal life and family
Scott Johnson and his wife Jill live on a farm in the town of Hebron, Wisconsin.  They have two adult children.

Electoral history

Wisconsin Assembly (2014)

| colspan="6" style="text-align:center;background-color: #e9e9e9;"| Republican Primary, August 12, 2014

Wisconsin Assembly (2022)

| colspan="6" style="text-align:center;background-color: #e9e9e9;"| Republican Primary, August 9, 2022

| colspan="6" style="text-align:center;background-color: #e9e9e9;"| General Election, November 8, 2022

References

External links
 Campaign website
 Scott Johnson at Wisconsin Vote
 

1954 births
Living people
Republican Party members of the Wisconsin State Assembly
People from Rock County, Wisconsin
People from Jefferson County, Wisconsin
21st-century American politicians
Farmers from Wisconsin